Christiansburg can refer to a place in the United States:

Christiansburg, Indiana
Christiansburg, Ohio
Christiansburg, Virginia